A , short for , is a published, unexamined Japanese patent application, in contrast to the kokoku or tokkyo kōhō, the examined and approved Japanese patent application. Kōkai means "open to the public", or "laid-open". Kōkai are published eighteen months after the earliest priority date.

 is another shorthand for kōkai tokkyo kōhō, taken from the first character of tokkyo (patent) and the second of kōkai.

See also 
 Japanese patent law

References 

Japanese patent law